CSS Georgia was a screw steamer of the Confederate States Navy, acquired in 1863, and captured by the Union Navy in 1864.

Construction
The ship was built in 1862 as the fast merchantman Japan. She had a round stern, iron frame, fiddle-bow figurehead, short, thick funnel and full poop. Having an iron hull, she was clearly unsuited to long cruises without drydocking during a period when antifouling under-body coatings were yet unknown. Commander James Dunwoody Bulloch, a key Confederate procurement agent overseas, would have nothing to do with iron bottoms, but Commander Matthew Fontaine Maury settled for Japan because wood (which could be coppered) was being superseded in Great Britain by the new metal; consequently wooden newbuilding contracts were not easy to buy up in British shipyards.

Service history

Confederate States Navy
The Confederate States Government purchased her at Dumbarton, Scotland, in March 1863. On 1 April 1863, she departed Greenock, reputedly bound for the East Indies and carrying a crew of fifty who had shipped for a voyage to Singapore. She rendezvoused with the steamer Alar off Ushant, France, and took on guns, ordnance and other stores. On 9 April 1863 the Confederate flag was hoisted and she was placed in commission as CSS Georgia, Commander William Lewis Maury, CSN, in command. Her orders read to prey against United States shipping wherever found.

Calling at Bahia, Brazil and at Trinidad, Georgia recrossed the Atlantic Ocean to Simon's Bay, Cape Colony, Africa, where she arrived on 16 August 1863. She sailed next to Santa Cruz, Tenerife, in the Canary Islands, thence up to Cherbourg, France, arriving 28 October 1863. During this short cruise she captured nine prizes.

On 2 May 1864 she was taken to Liverpool and sold on 1 June 1864 to a merchant of that city over the protest of Charles Francis Adams, Sr., United States Minister to Great Britain. She was sent into Boston, Massachusetts, where she was condemned and sold as a lawful prize of the United States.

Merchant ship

The ship was documented as the U.S. merchant ship SS Georgia in New Bedford, Massachusetts, on 5 August 1865. She was reregistered in Canada in 1870.

References

External links 

 

Cruisers of the Confederate States Navy
Georgia (U.S. state) in the American Civil War
Shipwrecks of the Maine coast
1862 ships
Maritime incidents in January 1875